Cleptocaccobius inermis, is a species of dung beetle found in India and Sri Lanka.

Description
This minute, broadly oval, compact species has an average length of about 3 mm. Body black and shiny. Legs and antennae except blackish club are orange-red in color. Upper surface consists with a thin fine pale setae. Head sparingly punctured with feeble and bluntly bilobed clypeus. Pronotum moderately punctured with blunt front angles. Elytra finely striate and sparingly punctured. Pygidium consists with sparse and very shallow pits. Male has a head without a carina. But in female, clypeus and forehead are separated by a curved carina.

References 

Scarabaeinae
Insects of Sri Lanka
Insects of India
Insects described in 1931